Ripstein is a surname. Notable people with the surname include: 

Alfredo Ripstein (1916–2007), Mexican film producer
Arturo Ripstein (born 1943), Mexican film director
Arthur Ripstein (born 1958), Canadian philosopher 
Gabriel Ripstein (born 1972), Mexican film producer, director, editor, and screenwriter
Jacqueline Ripstein, Mexican artist